2,4-Bis(4-hydroxybenzyl)phenol is a phenolic compound produced by the saprophytic orchid Gastrodia elata and by the myco-heterotroph orchid Galeola faberi.

References 

Polyphenols
Orchids